{{Infobox settlement
| name                   = Herbel
| native_name            = حربل
| native_name_lang       = ar
| type                   = Village
| pushpin_map            = Syria
| pushpin_label_position = bottom
| pushpin_mapsize        = 250
| pushpin_map_caption    = Location of Herbel in Syria
| coordinates            = 
| subdivision_type        = Country
| subdivision_name        = 
| subdivision_type1       = Governorate
| subdivision_name1       = Aleppo
| subdivision_type2       = District
| subdivision_name2       = Azaz
| subdivision_type3       = Subdistrict
| subdivision_name3       = Mare'
| elevation_m             = 
| population              = 3403
| population_density_km2  = auto
| population_as_of        = 2004
| population_footnotes    = {{#tag:ref|{{cite web |title=2004 Census Data for ''Nahiya Mare|url=http://www.cbssyr.sy/new%20web%20site/General_census/census_2004/NH/TAB02-25-2004.htm |publisher=Syrian Central Bureau of Statistics |language=ar }} Also available in English: |name=census2004}}
| timezone                = EET
| utc_offset              = +2
| timezone_DST            = EEST
| utc_offset_DST          = +3
| geocode                 = C1631
| website                 = 
}}Herbel (also spelled Herbil and Harbul''') is a village in northern Aleppo Governorate, northwestern Syria. With a population of 3,403 as per the 2004 census. Administratively, it is part of the Nahiya Mare' in A'zaz District. Nearby localities include Tell Rifaat to the northwest, Mare' to the northeast, Maarat Umm Hawsh to the southeast and Ihras to the southwest.

References

Villages in Aleppo Governorate
Populated places in Azaz District